The Acjachemen (alternate spelling: Acagchemem) are an Indigenous people of California. They historically lived south of what is known as Aliso Creek and north of the Las Pulgas Canyon in what are now the southern areas of Orange County and the northwestern areas of San Diego County. 

The Spanish colonizers called the Acjachemen Juaneños, following their baptism at Mission San Juan Capistrano in the late 18th century. Today many contemporary members of the tribe prefer the term Acjachemen as their autonym, or name for themselves. The name is derived from the village of Acjacheme, which was less than sixty yards from the site where Mission San Juan Capistrano was built in 1776.

Their language was a variety closely related to the Luiseño language of the nearby Payómkawichum (Luiseño) people. In the 20th century, the Juaneño Band of Mission Indians, Acjachemen Nation was organized but is not federally recognized. The lack of federal recognition has prevented the Acjachemen from accessing, protecting, and restoring their ancestral lands and sacred sites.

History

Pre-colonization 

Present-day  Orange, Northern San Diego County, Southern LA County, and Western Riverside County, is home to the Acjachemen people. Acjachemen believe they have lived there since the beginning of time. Archaeological evidence shows an Acjachemen presence there for over 10,000 years.

The Acjachemen resided in permanent, well-defined villages and seasonal camps. Village populations ranged from between 35 and 300 inhabitants, consisting of a single lineage in the smaller villages, and of a dominant clan joined with other families in the larger settlements. Each clan had its own resource territory and was "politically" independent; ties to other villages were maintained through economic, religious, and social networks in the immediate region. The elite class (composed chiefly of families, lineage heads, and other ceremonial specialists), a middle class (established and successful families), and people of disconnected or wandering families and captives of war comprised the three hierarchical social classes.

Native leadership consisted of the Nota, or clan chief, who conducted community rites and regulated ceremonial life in conjunction with the council of elders, which was made up of lineage heads and ceremonial specialists in their own right. This body decided upon matters of the community, which were then carried out by the Nota and his underlings. While the placement of residential huts in a village was not regulated, the ceremonial enclosure and the chief's home were most often centrally-located.

Mission period 
The highest concentration of Acjachemen villages was along the lower San Juan Creek. In 1775, Spanish colonists erected a cross on an Acjachemen religious site before retreating to San Diego due to a revolt at Mission San Diego. They returned one year later to begin constructing and converting the Acjachemen population. The majority of early converts were often children, who may have been brought by their parents in an attempt to "make alliances with missionaries, who not only possessed new knowledge and goods but also presented the threat of force." Spanish military presence ensured the continuation of the mission system.

In 1776, as Father Serra was approaching Acjachemen territory with a Spanish soldier and one "neophyte," a recently baptized Native who was a translator for Spanish authorities, a "crowd of painted and well-armed [Acjachemen] Indians, some of whom put arrows to their bowstrings as though they intended to kill the Spanish intruders" surrounded Serra's group. The "neophyte" informed the Acjachemen that attacking would only result in further violence from the Spanish military. As a result, the Acjachemen "desisted, aware of the serious threat that military retaliation represented."

While, prior to 1783, those who had been converted, known as "Juaneños, both children and adults, represented a relatively small percentage of the Acjachemen population, all that changed between 1790 and 1812, when the vast majority of remaining non-converts were baptized." Spanish colonists referred to the Acjachemen as Juaneño. The Acjachemen were designated as Juaneños by Spanish priests through the baptismal process performed at Mission San Juan Capistrano, named after St. Juan Capistrano in Spain. Many other local tribes were named in a similar manner (Kizh (pronounced keech) – Gabrieleño; named after Mission San Gabriel).

During the late eighteenth century, the mission economy had extended over the entire territory of the Acjachemen. While precolonial Acjachemen villages had "access to specific hunting, collecting, and fishing areas, and that within these collectively owned areas villagers also possessed private property," this indigenous land tenure system was effectively destroyed through the mission system and colonization. The Spanish transformed the countryside into grazing lands for livestock and horticulture. Between 1790 and 1804, "mission herds increased in size from 8,034 head to 26,814 head."

As European disease also began to decimate the rural population, the dominion and power of the Spanish missions over the Acjachemen further increased." By 1812, the mission was at the peak of its growth: "3,340 persons had been baptized at the mission, and 1,361 Juaneños resided in the mission compound." After 1812, the rate of Juaneños who died surpassed the amount of those who were baptized. By 1834, the Juaneño population had declined to about 800.

The Acjachemen resisted assimilation by practicing their cultural and religious ceremonies, performing sacred dances and healing rituals both in villages and within the mission compound. Missionaries attempted to prevent "indigenous forms of knowledge, authority, and power" from passing on to younger generations through placing recently baptized Indian children in monjerios "away from their parents from the age of seven or so until their marriage." Native children and adults were punished for disobeying Spanish priests through confinement and lashings. The logic behind these harsh practices was "integral to Catholic belief and practice." Gerónimo Boscana, a missionary at San Juan between 1812 and 1822, admitted that, despite harsh treatment, attempts to convert Native people to Christian beliefs and traditions were largely unsuccessful: "All the missionaries in California, declares Boscana, would agree that the true believer was the rare exception."

Emancipation from San Juan mission and Mexican rule 
Governor José María de Echeandía, the first Mexican governor of Alta California, issued a "Proclamation of Emancipation" (or "Prevenciónes de Emancipacion") on July 25, 1826, which freed Native people from San Diego Mission, Santa Barbara, and Monterey. When news of this spread to other missions it inspired widespread resistance to work and even open revolt. At San Juan, "the missionary stated that if the 956 neophytes residing at the mission in 1827 were 'kindly begged to go to work,' they would respond by saying simply that they were 'free.'" Following the Mexican secularization act of 1833, "neophyte alcades requested that the community be granted the land surrounding the mission, which the Juaneños had irrigated and were now using to support themselves."

However, while Juaneños "claimed and were granted villages," there was "rarely" any legal title issued, meaning that the land was "never formally ceded" to them following emancipation, which they protested as others encroached upon their traditional territory. While rancho grants issued by the Mexican government on the lands of the San Juan mission "were made in the early 1840s, Indians' rights to their village lands went unrecognized." Although the Juaneños were now "free," they were "increasingly vulnerable to being forced to work on public projects" if it was determined that they had "'reverted' to a state of dependence on wild fruits or neglected planting crops and herding" or otherwise failed to continue practicing Spanish-imposed methods of animal husbandry and horticulture. Because of a lack of formal recognition, "most of the former Acagchemem territory was incorporated into Californio ranchos by 1841, when San Juan Mission was formed into a pueblo."

The formation of the San Juan pueblo was a direct result of the actions of San Diego settlers, who petitioned the government in order to gain access to the lands of the mission territory. Prior to the formation of the pueblo, the "one-hundred or so Juaneños living there" were asked if they favored or opposed this change: seventy voted in favor, while thirty, mostly older, Juaneños opposed, "possibly because they did not want to live among the Californios." The formation of the San Juan pueblo granted Californios and Juaneño families solars, or lots for houses, and suertes, or plots of land in which to plant crops.

American occupation, genocide, and territorial conquest 

Following the American occupation of California in 1846 and the Treaty of Guadalupe Hidalgo, "Indian peoples throughout California were drawn into the 'cycles of conquest' that had been initiated by the Spanish." During the 1850s alone, the California Indian population declined by 80 percent. Any land rights Native people had under Mexican rule were completely erased under American occupation, as stated in Article 11 of the treaty: "A great part of the territories which, by the present treaty, are to be comprehended for the future within the limits of the United States, is now occupied by savage tribes." As the United States government declared its right to police and control Native people, the "claims of Indians who had acquired land in the 1841 formation" of the San Juan pueblo, "were similarly ignored, despite evidence that the [American] land commission had data substantiating these Juaneños' titles."

By 1860, Juaneños were recorded in the census "with Spanish first names and no surnames; the occupations of 38 percent of their household heads went unrecorded; and they owned only 1 percent of the land and 0.6 percent of the assets (including cattle, household items, and silver or gold)." It was recorded that 30 percent of all households were headed by women "who still lived in San Juan on the plots of land that had been distributed in 1841" under Mexican rule. It was reported that "shortly after the census was taken, the entire population began to leave the area for villages to the southeast of San Juan." A smallpox epidemic in 1862 took the lives of 129 Juaneño people in one month alone of a population now "of only some 227 Indians." The remaining Juaneños established themselves among the Luiseño, who they "shared linguistic and cultural similarities, family ties, and colonial histories." Even after their relocation to various Luiseño villages, "San Juan remained an important town for Juaneños and other Indians connected to it" so that by the "latter part of the nineteenth century individuals and families often moved back and forth between these villages and San Juan for work, residence, family events, and festivals."

American occupation resulted in increasing power and wealth for European immigrants and Anglo-Americans to own land and property by the 1860s, "in sharp contrast to the pattern among Californios, Mexicans, and Indians." In the Santa Ana and San Juan Capistrano townships, most Californios lost their ranchos in the 1860s. By 1870, European immigrants and Anglo-Americans now owned 87 percent of the land value and 86 percent of the assets. Native people went from owning 1 percent of the land value and assets, as recorded in the 1860 census, to 0 percent in 1870. Anglo-Americans became the majority of the population by the mid-1870s and the towns in which they resided "were characterized by a marked lack of ethnic diversity." In the 1890s, a permanent elementary school was constructed in San Juan. However, until 1920, for education beyond sixth grade, "students had to relocate to Santa Ana – an impossibility for the vast majority of Californio and Juaneño families."

Modern day

Religion 
Fray Gerónimo Boscana, a Franciscan scholar who was stationed at San Juan Capistrano for more than a decade beginning in 1812, compiled what is widely considered to be the most comprehensive study of precolonial religious practices in the San Juan Capistrano valley. Religious knowledge was secret, and the prevalent religion, called Chinigchinich, placed village chiefs in the position of religious leaders, an arrangement that gave the chiefs broad power over their people. Boscana divided the Acjachemen into two classes: the "Playanos" (who lived along the coast) and the "Serranos" (who inhabited the mountains, some three to four leagues from the Mission). The religious beliefs of the two groups as related to creation differed quite profoundly. The Playanos held that an all-powerful and unseen being called "Nocuma" brought about the earth and the sea, together with all of the trees, plants, and animals of sky, land, and water contained therein. The Serranos, on the other hand, believed in two separate but related existences: the "existence above" and the "existence below". These states of being were "altogether explicable and indefinite" (like brother and sister), and it was the fruits of the union of these two entities that created "...the rocks and sands of the earth; then trees, shrubbery, herbs and grass; then animals..."

Language 

Their language is related to the Luiseño language spoken by the nearby Luiseño tribe located to the interior. Considered to speak a dialect of Luiseño, the Juaneño were part of the Cupan subgroup of the Uto-Aztecan languages.

Their language became extinct by the early 20th century. The tribe is working at reviving it, with several members learning it. Their studies are based on the research and records of Anastacia Majel and John P. Harrington, who recorded the language in 1933. (The tape recordings resurfaced around 1995.)

Government 
The Juaneño Band of Mission Indians has organized a government. It elects a tribal council, assisted by tribal elders. The Juaneño Band headquarters is in San Juan Capistrano. There are more than 2,800 enrolled members.

In the 1990s, the Acjachemen Nation divided into three different governments, all claiming their identity as the Juaneño Band of Mission Indians, Acjachemen Nation.

The Juaneño Band of Mission Indians, Acjachemen Nation is recognized as a tribe by the state of California. In 2006, the County of Orange passed a resolution recognizing Juaneno Band of Mission Indians, Acjachemen Nation, to be the aboriginal tribe of Orange County (http://www.leginfo.ca.gov/pub/93-94/bill/asm/ab_0001-0050/ajr_48_bill_930922_chaptered). They filed a petition in 1982 to seek federal recognition as a tribe, and are working with the Bureau of Indian Affairs on documentation.

In the 21st century, the tribe filed a land claim, seeking to regain the territory of the former Marine Corps Air Station El Toro. This had been held by them as an Indian Rancheria until the 1930s. At that time, the US government bought the land for use as a defense facility. 

In May 2013, one segment of the Acjachemen Nation voted to elect the first all-female Juaneño tribal council in its history.

Most recently on July 10, 2021, the Acjachemen Nation elected a new Tribal Council - Heidi Lee Lucero, Chairwoman; Dr. Richard Rodman, Vice Chairman; Ricky Hernandez, Treasurer; Georgia "Chena" Edmundson, Secretary; Sabrina Banda, Member-At-Large; and Ruth "Cookie" Stoffel, Member-At-Large.

Notable Acjachemen 
 Paul "Mocho" Arbiso – Mission San Juan Capistrano patriarch and bell ringer.
 José de Grácia Cruz – Father of Paul Arbiso, bell ringer, and artisan.
 Bobbie Banda – elder who established Native American education programs in public schools.
 Thomas "Happy" Hunn – elder and San Juan Capistrano patriarch.
 Clarence H. Lobo (1912–1985) – chief, lobbyist, and spokesperson of the Juaneño for 39 years who "was responsible for the Johnson administration reimbursing California Indians $2.9 million for the loss of their land." In September 1994, the Clarence Lobo Elementary School opened in San Clemente as part of the Capistrano Unified School District. It was the first school in California to be named after a Native American leader.
 Adelia Sandoval – spiritual leader and cultural director of the Acjachemen nation.
 Jacque Tahuka-Nunez – educator and storyteller who was awarded "Educator of the Year in 2009 for the State of California in Native American Studies."
 Marian Walkingstick – elder, basketweaver, writer, and teacher.
Chief David Belardes – chief from 1990-2014. Tribal scholar, historian, genealogist, preservationist, cultural practitioner.
 Charles Sepulveda - professor and author
 Heidi Lee Lucero - Chairwoman and California State University, Long Beach Professor

See also 
 Population of Native California
 Classification of indigenous peoples of the Americas#California
 Mission Indians

References 
Notes

Citations

Works cited
 
 
 
 
 
 
 
 

Further reading

External links 
 
 Reverend Father Friar Gerónimo Boscana, 1846. "Chinigchinich; a Historical Account of the Origin, Customs, and Traditions of the Indians at the Missionary Establishment of St. Juan Capistrano, Alta California Called The Acjachemen Nation", Webroots
 Traditional California Native American Acjachemen Planting Song, Indigenous Peoples Issues

 
California Mission Indians
History of Orange County, California
History of San Diego County, California
Native American tribes in California